Pripoare may refer to several villages in Romania:

 Pripoare, a village in Sânger Commune, Mureș County
 Pripoare, a village in Perișani Commune, Vâlcea County